Odysseas Dean Gardikiotis (born 9 September 1994) is an Australian-born Greek professional footballer who plays as a goalkeeper.

Club career
Born in Australia, Gardikiotis started his career with Australian lower league sides, before joining Middlesbrough in 2008. He played for their youth sides for three years before joining then-Championship side Blackpool in 2011. After leaving Blackpool in 2014, he signed with non-league side Cray Wanderers, having trialled with Derby County.

He signed for Dartford in March 2016, and made his debut when he filled in for the injured Deren Ibrahim against Basingstoke Town in April 2016.

After a short spell with the Chivas USA Academy in Florida, Gardikiotis signed with Acharnaikos in 2017, having rejected a contract with the Greek side the previous year.

International career
Gardikiotis has represented the Greek under-17 side twice, making his debut in December 2009 in a friendly against Serbia.

Personal life
He is the son of the former player and manager Leon Gardikiotis.

Career statistics

Club

Notes

References

External links
 Dean Gardikiotis at Stoiximan.gr Football League

1994 births
Living people
Greek footballers
Australian soccer players
Association football goalkeepers
Football League (Greece) players
Middlesbrough F.C. players
Blackpool F.C. players
Cray Wanderers F.C. players
Dartford F.C. players
Acharnaikos F.C. players
Soccer players from Sydney